Johnatan Cardoso Dias (born 16 April 1997) is a Brazilian footballer who plays as a forward for Vila Nova.

Career statistics

Club

Notes

References

1997 births
Living people
Brazilian footballers
Association football forwards
Liga Portugal 2 players
Trindade Atlético Clube players
Académico de Viseu F.C. players
Expatriate footballers in Portugal
Brazilian expatriate sportspeople in Portugal